Aeaces (fl. 550 BC) was the father of Polycrates, the powerful tyrant of Samos. He was a prominent aristocrat in his own right, and may even have been the ruler of the island for a period in the mid-sixth century. He is sometimes referred to as Aeaces I to distinguish him from his grandson Aeaces II, who ruled Samos in the late sixth and early fifth centuries BC.

Life

Herodotus mentions Aeaces' name but does not provide any information about his life. A very late source, the Suda, says that Polycrates' father was the ruler of Samos around 565 BC. His wealth and power is also suggested by his ability to attract the poets Ibycus and Anacreon to his circle – the former wrote poetry for the young Polycrates, while the latter was supposedly his tutor.

A large seated statue of a goddess from the mid-sixth century BC, erected on the Astypalaea (the Samian Acropolis) bears an inscription identifying its dedicator as Aeaces. Stylistically, the statue appears to date to around 540 BC, while the inscription appears to be later (c. 500 BC). The inscription says:

This Aeaces is generally identified with the father of Polycrates, despite the date of the inscription. M. White suggests that inscription made by Aeaces II in order to emphasise his hereditary right to rule. The statue seems to have been erected using the proceeds from captured booty (although other interpretations are possible). This might indicate that the powerful Samian thalassocracy of Polycrates had its roots in the time of Aeaces. It is not clear whether the inscription reveals Aeaces as the sole ruler of Samos (as his son would later be), or as just one powerful man among many. A bronze pot dedicated at the Heraion c. 575–550 BC has an inscription identifying its dedicator as Brychon, son of Timoleos. This might be Aeaces' father.

Aeaces' period of greatest prominence overlaps with a phase of great prosperity on Samos. The period witnessed the monumentalisation of the Heraion sanctuary, including the construction of the Rhoikos temple – the first of the great Ionian temples and the largest Greek temple built up to that time. If Aeaces was ruler of Samos, his son Polycrates did not inherit the position directly. Herodotus tells us that he seized control around 540 BC by means of a coup.

References

Bibliography
 
 
 
 
 
 

Ancient Greek rulers
Ancient Samians
6th-century BC Greek people